Double homeobox, 4 also known as DUX4 is a protein which in humans is encoded by the DUX4 gene. Its misexpression is the cause of facioscapulohumeral muscular dystrophy (FSHD).

Gene

This gene is located within a D4Z4 macrosatellite repeat array in the subtelomeric region of chromosome 4q35. The D4Z4 repeat array contains 11-150 D4Z4 repeats in the general population; a highly homologous D4Z4 repeat array has been identified on chromosome 10. The gene consists of three exons. Exons 1 and 2 are present in each D4Z4 repeat. Only one copy of exon 3 is present, telomeric to the D4Z4 repeat array. The open reading frame (ORF) is entirely contained within exon 1 and contains two homeoboxes. Exons 2 and 3 encode for the three prime untranslated region (3′-UTR). In certain haplotypes, exon 3 contains a polyadenylation signal. There was no evidence for transcription from standard cDNA libraries however RT-PCR and in-vitro expression experiments indicate that the ORF is transcribed.

The repeat-array and ORF are conserved in other mammals.

Structure
DUX4 protein is 424 amino acids long. Two homeodomains are situated at the N-terminus. A transcription-activating domain (TAD) and p300-binding domain are situated at the C-terminus. The TAD encompasses a potential nine amino acid TAD (9aaTAD).

The two homeodomains and TAD have well-defined tertiary structure. The region between the second homeodomain and TAD is predicted to be disordered.

DUX4 transcripts can be spliced to produce either DUX4-S (short) or DUX4-FL (full length) mRNAs. DUX4-FL mRNA encodes for the entire DUX4 protein. DUX4-S mRNA encodes for a partial DUX4 protein, which lacks the transcription-activating domain.

Function 
DUX4 protein a transcriptional activator of many genes, one example being paired-like homeodomain transcription factor 1 (PITX1). It likely stimulates zygotic genome activation.

The two homeodomains allow DUX4 protein to bind to DNA. The C-terminal domain is involved in target gene activation.

DUX is normally expressed in the testes, thymus, and cleavage-stage embryos.

Clinical significance

Inappropriate expression of DUX4 in muscle cells is the cause of facioscapulohumeral muscular dystrophy (FSHD).

Overexpression of DUX4 due to translocations can cause B-cell leukemia. A translocation that merges DUX4 with CIC can cause an aggressive type of sarcoma.

See also 
 Homeobox
 PITX1

References 

Genes
Human proteins